Jean-Marie-Victor Viel (1796–1863) was a French architect who designed the Palais de l'Industrie, an exhibition hall located between the Seine River and the Champs-Élysées which was erected for the Paris World Fair in 1855.

References 

1796 births
1863 deaths
19th-century French architects